Saints and Sinners is the second studio album by Kane Roberts. It was produced by Desmond Child, who also has co-writing credits on all tracks.

"Twisted" was the album's first single. The accompanying video featured model and actress Tania Coleridge. The second single, "Does Anybody Really Fall in Love Anymore?", became a hit on radio and MTV, peaking at No. 38 on Billboard's Hot 100 chart. It was written by Child, Jon Bon Jovi, Richie Sambora, and Diane Warren, and was previously recorded by Cher for her 1989 album Heart of Stone.

Track listing

Personnel
Kane Roberts – vocals, lead and rhythm guitar
John McCurry – guitar
Chuck Kentis – keyboards
Steve Steele – bass
Myron Grombacher – drums

References

External links
Discogs entry
Discogs entry of the single
Amazon entry

1991 albums
Albums produced by Desmond Child
Geffen Records albums